Euchaetes perlevis is a moth of the family Erebidae. It was described by Augustus Radcliffe Grote in 1882. It is found in the US states of Arizona, New Mexico and Texas.

The wingspan is about 23 mm.

References

 Arctiidae genus list at Butterflies and Moths of the World of the Natural History Museum

Phaegopterina
Moths described in 1882